Joseph Henry Ranft (March 13, 1960 – August 16, 2005) was an American screenwriter, animator,  storyboard artist and voice actor. He worked for Pixar Animation Studios and Disney at Walt Disney Animation Studios and Disney Television Animation. His younger brother Jerome Ranft is a sculptor who also worked on several Pixar films.

Ranft's first film was The Brave Little Toaster in 1987. He received an Academy Award for Best Original Screenplay nomination as one of the writers of Toy Story (1995), and was also the co-director on Cars (2006), his final work before his death.

Early life
Joseph Henry Ranft was born in Pasadena, California, on March 13, 1960, and raised in Whittier. His parents were James and Melissa Ranft. As a child, Ranft developed a love for magic, storytelling, film and comedy. At age 15, he became a member of the Magic Castle Junior Group. After graduating from Monte Vista High School, Whittier, in 1978, Ranft began studying in the character animation program at the California Institute of the Arts alongside John Lasseter and Brad Bird. After two years, Ranft's student film Good Humor caught the attention of Disney animation executives, who offered him a job.

Career
In 1980, Ranft joined Disney as a writer and storyboard artist. During his first five years with Disney, he worked on a number of television projects that were never produced. Later in his Disney career, he was promoted into the Feature Animation department, where he was mentored by Eric Larson. Ranft later spoke about Larson's training: "He always reminds me of just the fundamental things that I tend to forget. You know, it's like, animation is so complex; 'How many drawings are in there?' and stuff, but Eric always comes back to like; 'What does the audience perceive?'"

Around this time, he studied under and began performing with the improvisational group, The Groundlings. Ranft stayed with Disney throughout the 1980s, writing the story on many animated features, including Oliver & Company, The Lion King and Beauty and the Beast. He also worked on The Brave Little Toaster in 1987 for Hyperion Animation and James and the Giant Peach in 1996 for Allied Filmmakers.

Ranft reunited with Lasseter when he was hired by Pixar in 1991 as their head of story. There he worked on all of their films produced up to 2006; this included Toy Story (for which he received an Academy Award nomination for Best Original Screenplay) and A Bug's Life, as the co-story writer and others as story supervisor. He also voiced characters in many of the films, including Heimlich the caterpillar in A Bug's Life, Wheezy the penguin in Toy Story 2, and Jacques the shrimp in Finding Nemo.

In the movie Monsters, Inc., Ranft had a monster named after him (J.J. Ranft) as most of the scarers in the film were named for Pixar staff. Ranft was also given lead story credit on The Brave Little Toaster (1987) and voiced Elmo St. Peters, the appliance salesman. 

His favorite writers were Kurt Vonnegut, Hunter S. Thompson, and Tom Wolfe. His favorite magicians were John Carney, Daryl, Michael Ammar, Ricky Jay and Jimmy Grippo.

He was posthumously honored in 2006 as a Disney Legend and in 2016 with the Winsor McCay Award, the lifetime achievement award for animators.

Death and legacy
On August 16, 2005, Ranft, 45, and his friend Eric Frierson, 39, were passengers in Ranft's 2004 Honda Element, which was being driven by another friend, Elegba Earl, 32. Earl suddenly lost control and crashed through a guard rail while northbound on Highway 1. The SUV tumbled down a cliff and plunged  into the mouth of the Navarro River where it meets the Pacific Ocean in Mendocino County, killing both Ranft and Earl instantly. Frierson survived by escaping through the sun roof, though he received moderate injuries.
Ranft died during the production of Cars, which he co-directed and voice acted in. The film and tie-in game are dedicated to his memory, as is Tim Burton's Corpse Bride, on which Ranft was executive producer.  His remains were cremated.

Ranft has been recognized by colleagues and in various tributes in animated films released after his death. Henry Selick called him "the story giant of our generation." In honor of Ranft, in Selick's animated film production Coraline, the moving SUV that moves Coraline into her new apartment is emblazoned with a "Ranft Moving, Inc." logo. The movers themselves are modeled after Ranft and his brother Jerome, who voiced one of the movers. Jerome took over most of Ranft's voice roles following his brother’s death. The 2010 Blu-Ray and DVD re-release of Toy Story 2 includes a special feature that focuses on Ranft and his accomplishments titled "Celebrating Our Friend Joe Ranft". Ranft did early drawings for the character of Finn McMissile in an unused scene from the film Cars, and his drawings were later used in creating the character for Cars 2. John Lasseter has cited Ranft as being one of the main inspirations for the character of Mater from those films, and described his influence as being "all over Cars 2". In the film Inside Out, the character of Jangles the clown is based on a character created by Ranft outside of Pixar named "Buttocks the Clown", according to co-director Ronnie del Carmen and story artist Domee Shi. The end credits of the Pixar film Coco showcase a digital ofrenda with pictures of many Pixar employees and their loved ones who had previously died, including Ranft. Additionally, the 2020 film Soul includes his name on a wall of previous mentors to the character 22.

Filmography

Feature films

Short films and television specials

Documentaries

Video games

Theme parks

References

External links
 
 Pixar Artist's Corner with Joe
 Michael Sragow (November 23, 1999) "Toy" Story Man. Salon.
 Peter Hartlaub (September 17, 2003) The secret of Pixar's magic can be found at CalArts.... San Francisco Chronicle.
 Disney Legends profile
 Remembrance by James S. Baker
 Remembering Joe Ranft by John Musker, via Pixar Planet.
 

1960 births
2005 deaths
20th-century American male actors
20th-century screenwriters
Accidental deaths in California
American magicians
American male voice actors
American male film actors
American storyboard artists
Animators from California
Animation screenwriters
California Institute of the Arts alumni
Male actors from Pasadena, California
Pixar people
Road incident deaths in California
Walt Disney Animation Studios people
Writers from Pasadena, California